The duckbill pugolovka (Anatirostrum profundorum) is a species of gobiid fish endemic to the southern part of the Caspian Sea. It is characterized by its special flattened and elongated head that resembles a duck's bill. It is the only known species in its genus.

Only recently more samples of this species have been collected from Iranian waters, where it mainly lives at 50–100 m depth.

References

Benthophilinae
Monotypic fish genera
Fish described in 1927
Fish of Western Asia
Fish of the Caspian Sea